PSR J1951+1123 is a pulsar. This pulsar is notable due to its exceptionally long period, one of the longest known, with a period of 5.09 seconds.

References

External links
 PSR J1951+1123
 Image PSR J1951+1123

Aquila (constellation)
Pulsars